The 1952 Cornell Big Red football team was an American football team that represented Cornell University as an independent during the 1952 college football season. In its sixth season under head coach George K. James, the team compiled a 2–7 record and was outscored 195 to 68. Bill Whelan was the team captain. 

Cornell played its home games at Schoellkopf Field in Ithaca, New York.

Schedule

References

Cornell
Cornell Big Red football seasons
Cornell Big Red football